Tenetehara may refer to:
 Tenetehara people, an ethnic group of Brazil
 Tenetehara language, a language of Brazil
 Tenetehara languages, a group of languages

Language and nationality disambiguation pages